René Mauriès (16 February 1921 – 23 May 1999) was a 20th-century French journalist, reporter and writer.

Biography 
After a bachelor's degree in letters, he began in 1945 with La République du Sud-Ouest as a war correspondent in Germany, then entered in 1949 in the daily newspaper La Dépêche du Midi where he accomplished his entire journalistic career. He carried out all activities, from reporter to sports columnist, notably on the Tour de France (thirty-seven tours covered), judicial columnist (from the Dominici affair to the Klaus Barbie trial), and finally editor-in-chief. It covered presidential trips. He was sent to all hot spots, Indochina, Algeria, Kurdistan, Iran, China ... He was friend with Joseph Kessel, Kléber Haedens, Antoine Blondin. His stories were rewarded with the prizes  in 1954 (for his articles about l'Indochine disponible), the Albert Londres Prize in 1956 for his reports on the Rif War, where he was wounded). At thirty-five, he was the only journalist to have received these two major awards for reporting. In 1967, he published in La Dépêche du Midi a series of reports on the genocide of the Kurdish peshmergas, Kurdistan ou la mort, later published in book. After the Munich massacre of 1972, which he saw closely, he recounted his romanticized experience in Le Cap de la Gitane which was awarded the prix Interallié in 1974.

In addition to his professional activities, René Mauriès carried out numerous social actions, particularly in the treatment of heart disease, including that of the "blue child" and multiple sclerosis.

A prize bearing his name was established in 2006 to perpetuate his memory and to reward young journalists.

Works 
1967: Le Kurdistan ou la mort, 
1974: Le Cap de la Gitane, Fayard, prix Interallié
1974: Toulouse, cité du destin, photographs by Jean Dieuzaide, Havas
1978: La Moreneta, La Table ronde
1992: Jean-Baptiste Doumeng, le grand absent, 
2001: Le Maître de mes secrets, Loubatières

Prizes 
1956: Prix Albert-Londres
1974: Prix Interallié
1974: Prix Henri Desgrange of the

References

External links 
 Journalisme. Le Prix René-Mauriès décerné à Toulouse on La Dépêche du Midi (29 January 2008)
 Dans les pas de René Mauriès, seul témoin étranger de la bataille de Rwanduz en 1966 on Le Phénix Kurde
 Journalisme : Prix René-Mauriès 2011 (Toulouse) on YouTube

20th-century French journalists
20th-century French writers
Albert Londres Prize recipients
Prix Interallié winners
1921 births
People from Tarn (department)
1999 deaths
French expatriates in Germany